Warter Priory was built by the Pennington family of Muncaster Castle in the late 17th century. Originally named Warter Hall, it was renamed Warter Priory following extensive Victorian redevelopment. It is not to be confused with the medieval monastic priory, the site of which lies north of St James' Church at Warter in the East Riding of Yorkshire, England. The house stood one mile south-west of the village and was demolished in 1972, the rubble being used to fill the lake in the extensive gardens.

References

British country houses destroyed in the 20th century
Monasteries in the East Riding of Yorkshire